The 1975 Oklahoma Sooners football team represented the University of Oklahoma in the 1975 NCAA Division I football season. The team was helmed by Barry Switzer in his third season as head coach. After sailing through their first eight games, Oklahoma suffered a surprising home loss to Kansas, which snapped a 28-game winning streak.  With only two regular season games and a bowl trip left, any hopes for a repeat national championship looked slim. 
 
OU defeated Missouri, 28–27, in Columbia before coming home to defeat second-ranked Nebraska, 35–10 to take the Big 8 Conference title. With the conference title in tow, the No. 3-ranked Sooners, in their first bowl game under Switzer, headed to the Orange Bowl to meet Michigan. 
 
OU prevailed in that game with a 14–6 victory and got pushed to the top spot in the polls when both #1 Ohio State and #2 Texas A&M suffered defeats in their bowl games. Oklahoma won its 27th conference and fifth national championship.

The Sooners served their third season of NCAA probation in 1975. They were banned from appearing on television during the regular season, but the portion of the probation banning them from bowl games was lifted (Oklahoma did not play in a bowl game in 1973, but appeared twice on television; it was banned from both television and bowl games in 1974). Oklahoma returned to television for the Orange Bowl.

Schedule

Roster

Game summaries
Oklahoma had won the AP National Title in 1974 and began the year by thrashing Oregon 62–7 in Norman.  OU played host to a Johnny Majors coached #15 Pittsburgh squad, sporting junior running back sensation Tony Dorsett (only a year away from the Heisman trophy and the collegiate rushing record), and they dominated, outscoring the Panthers 46–10. But a trip to unranked Miami was nearly fatal.  The Sooners scored all 20 of their points in the second quarter and finished with just 163 rushing yards and 176 total, barely surviving a ten-point Hurricanes' fourth quarter en route to a 20–17 victory. That win was not enough to knock the Sooners to the second spot in the polls, but a one-point win over Colorado the following week was. Against the Buffaloes, the vaunted Sooner wishbone offense looked abysmal, and they surrendered a 14-point lead in the second half. A botched CU extra point in the final 79 seconds proved the difference. Ohio State took over the number one ranking. The Sooners, despite the close calls, came into Dallas atop a 24-game winning streak and a 33-game unbeaten streak and ranked #2 in the country.

Oregon

Pittsburgh

Miami (FL)

Colorado

Texas

        

    
    
    
    
    

Texas came into Dallas with a bona fide superstar in 225-pound sophomore fullback Earl Campbell.  The fearsome runner had trampled everything in his path en route to 508 yards (8.1 ypc), including 198 yards against Washington.  Behind the young Campbell, the Longhorns were leading the nation in rushing, total offense and scoring, averaging 44 points per game.

The Sooners had a leader in Steve Davis, an ordained minister that could run and pass.  The halfbacks, Joe Washington and Horace Ivory were speedy and elusive.  The receiving corps, paced by Senior Billy Brooks, was among the best of the wishbone era at OU.  Of course, the greatest asset to the Sooners was not on offense.  The 1975 OU defense was among the very best in a storied history, led by Lee Roy Selmon, who would go on to win both the Outland Trophy and the Lombardi Award as the nation's best lineman.

It was the Sooner defense that made the Longhorns lose a fifth straight Red River Shootout.  Neither offense exploded with big plays, both scoring hard fought points in the red zone.  The game was best characterized by the hard hitting from both sides, which led to a considerable number of turnovers.  The Longhorns fumbled the ball four times and gave away an interception.  The Sooners lost two fumbles.  The Sooner defense proved its mettle against the powerful Campbell, holding him to 95 yards on 23 carries.  Although he was the game's leading ball carrier, he also marked the 21st straight time that a team failed to have a 100-yard rusher against the Sooners.  The Sooners prevailed 24–17.

Kansas State

Iowa State

Oklahoma State

Kansas

After thrashing Kansas State, Iowa State, and Oklahoma State by a combined score of 91–17, the Sooners returned home. Inexplicably, a team that had run roughshod over equivalent teams, managed to suffer a 23–3 loss to unranked Kansas, a team that came into Norman with a 5–3 record. The Sooners were caught flat and were upset by the Jayhawks, knocking them from the #2 spot in the polls down to #7. In Columbia against #18 Missouri the following week, they needed a 71-yard touchdown run from Joe Washington on a critical fourth and one, a Washington run for a successful two-point conversion, and two missed field goal attempts by the Tigers in the final two minutes to eke out a 28–27 win. The struggles took their toll, and OU found themselves down another spot in the poll heading into the annual showdown against Nebraska. The defending national champs were reeling and in search of an identity. No game could have had nearly as much on the line as the final regular season game for the Big 8 Championship.

Missouri

Nebraska

    
    
    
    
    
    
    

Nebraska began 1975 mostly under the radar, but they were riding a 10–0 record and sporting one of the best passing quarterbacks in the nation in Vince Ferragamo, who had transferred a season before from California.  He had completed 66 of 109 passes for 1,007 yards and 12 touchdowns, against only two interceptions. The Huskers had stepped into the #2 spot in the polls that the Sooners had vacated in their loss to Kansas.

The Cornhusker offense was balanced, averaging 265.6 yards rushing and 156.7 yards passing per game, and was among the nation's leaders in scoring, averaging 34.3 points per game.  The Nebraska defense was allowing only 8.5 points per game. They had posted four shutouts, including their last two opponents to run their string to ten consecutive scoreless quarters. The Black Shirt D had held the same Jayhawks team that had upset OU earlier in the season to only 177 yards of total offense.

The Big Eight title, as usual, was on the line in 1975. The winner would play in the Orange Bowl with a possible shot at a national championship. Oklahoma, realizing all that was on the line, had worked with Fiesta Bowl officials for a potential bid in Tempe if they lost to the Cornhuskers.  Nebraska had shunned the Fiesta officials, possibly shutting themselves out of the bowls in the event of a loss.

Ultimately, the Sooners came out of Norman with the conference title and the shot at a national title in the Orange Bowl, and it turned out to not even be close. Three turnovers in the fourth quarter had ended the Huskers' chances.  Oklahoma scored on all three to make it five touchdowns from six Nebraska turnovers. The Sooners came away with a convincing and incredible 25-point victory over the second-ranked team in the land.

Once again, it was the Oklahoma defense that made the big plays when they needed to and controlled the Nebraska offense, limiting them to 245 total yards, only 70 on the ground. Ferragamo, who came into the game with high expectations, had completed 13 of his 25 passes for 146 yards.  His four turnovers, however, had spoiled the game for Nebraska, and Oklahoma was on its way to face Michigan in the 1976 Orange Bowl.

Orange Bowl

UCLA upset top-ranked Ohio State earlier in the day, and Oklahoma knew that it had a chance for a national title in Barry Switzer's first bowl game as a head coach.  It wouldn't be easy.  The Wolverines were a punishing team, and made the Sooners know it early.  In the end, a 39-yard end around by Billy Brooks and a nine-yard keeper by Steve Davis were enough for a 14–6 victory and a fifth national championship.

Rankings

Awards and honors

All-Americans
 Lee Roy Selmon, Defensive tackle 
 Dewey Selmon, Noseguard 
 Terry Webb, Offensive guard
 Mike Vaughan, Offensive tackle 
 Billy Brooks, Split end
 Jimbo Elrod, Defensive end  
 Tinker Owens, Split end 
 Joe Washington, Halfback

Individual award winners
 Lee Roy Selmon – Outland Trophy, Lombardi Award

Postseason

NFL draft
The following players were drafted into the National Football League following the season.

References

Oklahoma
Oklahoma Sooners football seasons
College football national champions
Big Eight Conference football champion seasons
Orange Bowl champion seasons
Oklahoma Sooners football